Scopula prouti  is a moth of the family Geometridae. It is found from north-eastern China to Korea, Japan and south-eastern Russia.

Subspecies
Scopula prouti prouti
Scopula prouti kurilula Bryk, 1942

References

Moths described in 1935
Taxa named by Louis Beethoven Prout
prouti
Moths of Asia